Camden is an unincorporated community in Lewis County, West Virginia, United States. Camden has a post office with ZIP code 26338.

The community was named after Johnson N. Camden, a United States Senator from West Virginia.

References

Unincorporated communities in Lewis County, West Virginia
Unincorporated communities in West Virginia